The Men's 3 m synchro springboard competition of the 2016 European Aquatics Championships was held on 13 May 2016.

Results
The final was held at 21:00.

References

Diving